The Battle of Borisov took place on 21 November 1812, between parts of the French army and parts of the Russian armies. The Russian army under Lambert defeated the French troops under Dombrowsky.

Background
The French had suffered a defeat just two weeks earlier during the Battle of Krasnoi. Napoleon's army amounted to no more than 20,000 combatants. However, the union with Victor, Oudinot and Dombrowsky brought the numerical strength of the Grande Armée back up to some 49,000 French combatants as well as about 40,000 stragglers. But Minsk had been occupied by Chichagov on 16 November 1812 who reached the Berezina with about 31,500 combatants.

Battle
On the 21 November, the Russians under Lambert occupied Borisov in the morning before Oudinot could come up as the sentries had been ambushed. Dombrowski had about 2,000 men left. The Russians casualties were about 2,000, including Lambert, mortally wounded.

Aftermath
The Russians destroyed the bridge at Borisov on 22 November. The Battle of Loschniza is Oudinot 's reaction.

See also
List of battles of the French invasion of Russia

Notes

References

External links
 

Battles of the French invasion of Russia
Battles of the Napoleonic Wars
Battles involving Poland
Battles involving Russia
Battles involving France
Conflicts in 1812
1812 in the Russian Empire
1812 in Belarus
November 1812 events
Barysaw
Military history of Belarus
Minsk Governorate